Robert Carlyle Hayton (June 28, 1932 – April 9, 2003) was a Canadian football player who played for the Edmonton Eskimos. He won the Grey Cup with them in 1954.
He played with the Edmonton Eskimos while completing medical school at the University of Alberta. He interned at the Calgary General Hospital and then moved to Loon Lake, Saskatchewan where he worked for 2 years as a GP. He then moved to Saskatoon to train further in Internal Medicine with another year of training at the London Heart Hospital (England) in Cardiology. He worked for the rest of his career as a Cardiologist in Saskatoon.

References

1932 births
2003 deaths
Edmonton Elks players
Players of Canadian football from Alberta